Cyrus Gilbert Wiley (August 13, 1881 – January 3, 1930) served as president of Georgia State Industrial College for Colored Youth from 1921 and until 1926. He succeeded the first president, Richard R. Wright.

Biography

Early life and education
Wiley attended Georgia State Industrial College for Colored Youth soon after its founding in 1891. He graduated in 1902.

President
Wiley succeeded Richard R. Wright as president of the college in 1921. During his term as president, the first female students were admitted as boarding students on the campus. Additionally, the college was established as a federal agricultural extension center.

Legacy
The Willcox-Wiley Physical Education Complex, built in 1954 on the university's campus, is named in honor of Cyrus G. Wiley.

Suggested reading
Hall, Clyde W (1991). One Hundred Years of Educating at Savannah State College, 1890–1990. East Peoria, Ill.: Versa Press.

References

Presidents of Savannah State University
1881 births
1930 deaths
20th-century African-American educators
20th-century American academics